Simon Peh Yun-lu  (born 1955) was Director of Immigration of Hong Kong, and was appointed Commissioner of the Independent Commission Against Corruption in 2012.

Early life and education 
Peh was born in Anxi County, Quanzhou, Fujian. graduated from Pui Ching Middle School in 1973. He completed college in 1978.

Career 
Peh joined  the Immigration Department as an Immigration Officer. In 1984, he was promoted to Senior Immigration Officer, and Chief Immigration Officer in 1991. In 2004, he began serving as Assistant Director of Immigration.  In April 2008, Peh was appointed Director of Immigration when his predecessor Lai Tung-kwok accepted the post of Under Secretary for Security. He retired from the Immigration Department in April 2011. He was succeeded by Eric Chan.

Personal life 
On 5 January 2022, Carrie Lam announced new warnings and restrictions against social gathering due to potential COVID-19 outbreaks. One day later, it was discovered that Peh attended a birthday party hosted by Witman Hung Wai-man, with 222 guests. At least one guest tested positive with COVID-19, causing all guests to be quarantined. He was ordered to take leave until 24 January.

References

Government officials of Hong Kong
Hong Kong civil servants
1955 births
Living people
University of California, Berkeley alumni
Alumni of King's College London
Recipients of the Silver Bauhinia Star
Recipients of the Gold Bauhinia Star